Acmaturris pelicanus is a species of sea snail, a marine gastropod mollusc in the family Mangeliidae.

Description
The length of the shell attains 4 mm.

Distribution
This marine species occurs in the Gulf of Mexico.

References

 García E.F. 2008. Eight new molluscan species (Gastropoda: Turridae) from the western Atlantic, with description of two new genera. Novapex 9(1): 1–15

External links
 

pelicanus
Gastropods described in 2008